Celleporaria is a genus of bryozoans belonging to the family Lepraliellidae.

The genus has cosmopolitan distribution.

Species:

Celleporaria advena 
Celleporaria agglutinans 
Celleporaria albirostris 
Celleporaria altirostris 
Celleporaria ampliata 
Celleporaria aperta 
Celleporaria apiculata 
Celleporaria atlantica 
Celleporaria australis 
Celleporaria bicirrhata 
Celleporaria bicornis 
Celleporaria bipora 
Celleporaria bispinata 
Celleporaria brunnea 
Celleporaria calva 
Celleporaria capensis 
Celleporaria carvalhoi 
Celleporaria celleporina 
Celleporaria columnaris 
Celleporaria compressa 
Celleporaria contabulata 
Celleporaria convexa 
Celleporaria cornigera 
Celleporaria cornuta 
Celleporaria corrugata 
Celleporaria crassa 
Celleporaria crassicollis 
Celleporaria cristata 
Celleporaria cucullata 
Celleporaria cylindrocystis 
Celleporaria decostilsii 
Celleporaria desioi 
Celleporaria desperabilis 
Celleporaria discoidea 
Celleporaria discus 
Celleporaria distoma 
Celleporaria echinata 
Celleporaria elatior 
Celleporaria emancipata 
Celleporaria endivia 
Celleporaria erectorostris 
Celleporaria erugo 
Celleporaria fabiani 
Celleporaria firmispinosa 
Celleporaria fissurata 
Celleporaria fistulosa 
Celleporaria foliacea 
Celleporaria foliata 
Celleporaria foraminosa 
Celleporaria fusca 
Celleporaria gambierensis 
Celleporaria globularis 
Celleporaria gondwanae 
Celleporaria gracilis 
Celleporaria granulosa 
Celleporaria granulosa 
Celleporaria hancocki 
Celleporaria hastigera 
Celleporaria hemispherica 
Celleporaria hesperopacifica 
Celleporaria honolulensis 
Celleporaria imbellis 
Celleporaria imberbis 
Celleporaria inaudita 
Celleporaria indiscreta 
Celleporaria inflata 
Celleporaria intermedia 
Celleporaria jacksoniensis 
Celleporaria kataokai 
Celleporaria labelligera 
Celleporaria lagaaiji 
Celleporaria macrodon 
Celleporaria magnifica 
Celleporaria magnirostris 
Celleporaria mamillata 
Celleporaria massalis 
Celleporaria mauritiana 
Celleporaria melanodermorpha 
Celleporaria mesetaensis 
Celleporaria micropora 
Celleporaria minuta 
Celleporaria montgomeryensis 
Celleporaria mordax 
Celleporaria mucronata 
Celleporaria multiformatata 
Celleporaria musensis 
Celleporaria nodulosa 
Celleporaria notulaperta 
Celleporaria nummularia 
Celleporaria oculata 
Celleporaria oliva 
Celleporaria orbifera 
Celleporaria ovata 
Celleporaria palmata 
Celleporaria papillosa 
Celleporaria paratridenticulata 
Celleporaria peristomaria 
Celleporaria peristomata 
Celleporaria pigmentaria 
Celleporaria pilaefera 
Celleporaria pirabasensis 
Celleporaria pisiformis 
Celleporaria polymorpha 
Celleporaria polyphyma 
Celleporaria polythele 
Celleporaria projecta 
Celleporaria prolifera 
Celleporaria protea 
Celleporaria pugioniforme 
Celleporaria pygmaea 
Celleporaria redriverensis 
Celleporaria repens 
Celleporaria reussi 
Celleporaria rosefieldensis 
Celleporaria rostrifera 
Celleporaria schubarti 
Celleporaria separata 
Celleporaria serratirostris 
Celleporaria sherryae 
Celleporaria sibogae 
Celleporaria sicaria 
Celleporaria simplex 
Celleporaria speciosa 
Celleporaria spicata 
Celleporaria subalba 
Celleporaria subdecostilsii 
Celleporaria subflava 
Celleporaria transversa 
Celleporaria triacantha 
Celleporaria triangula 
Celleporaria triangulavicularis 
Celleporaria tridenticulata 
Celleporaria trifurcata 
Celleporaria trispiculata 
Celleporaria trispinosa 
Celleporaria trituberculata 
Celleporaria tuberculata 
Celleporaria tubulosa 
Celleporaria umbonata 
Celleporaria umbonata 
Celleporaria umbonatoidea 
Celleporaria vagans 
Celleporaria valligera 
Celleporaria vermiformis 
Celleporaria verrucosa 
Celleporaria volsella 
Celleporaria wakayamensis

References

Bryozoan genera